Maxim Eduardovich Mamin (born 17 May 1988) is a Russian professional ice hockey centre who is currently an unrestricted free agent who most recently played for Admiral Vladivostok in the Kontinental Hockey League (KHL).

In June 2008, after failing a drug test at the 2008 World Junior Ice Hockey Championships, the International Ice Hockey Federation (IIHF) suspended Mamin for two years.

References

External links

1988 births
Living people
Admiral Vladivostok players
HC Vityaz players
Metallurg Magnitogorsk players
People from Marneuli
Russian ice hockey centres
Salavat Yulaev Ufa players
Traktor Chelyabinsk players